Kettle Creek Battlefield is a  historic site outside Washington, Georgia in Wilkes County, Georgia, at the location of the Battle of Kettle Creek, in 1779, in the American Revolutionary War. It was added to the National Register of Historic Places on June 26, 1975. In January 2021 the Kettle Creek Battlefield became affiliated with the National Park Service.

There are also historical markers placed by the Georgia Historical Commission. In 1900 the Daughters of the American Revolution purchased 12 acres. The Kettle Creek Battlefield Association acquired 60 acres in 2013. In 2018 the American Battlefield Trust and its partners have acquired and preserved 180 acres of the Kettle Creek Battlefield through mid-2018.

See also

 National Register of Historic Places listings in Wilkes County, Georgia

References

battlefields in the United States
conflict sites on the National Register of Historic Places in Georgia (U.S. state)
National Register of Historic Places in Wilkes County, Georgia
protected areas of Wilkes County, Georgia